The striped thorny katydid (Acanthoproctus vittatus) is a species of katydid that is found in South Africa, predominantly in the Karoo biome.

References

Tettigoniidae
Insects described in 1869
Endemic insects of South Africa